Matthew Leslie Jenner is a British entrepreneur. At present he holds positions in 35 companies, including pawn shops and "pay day loan" businesses. He has been involved in a number of companies which operated tax avoidance schemes, which were subsequently overturned by HMRC.

Tax avoidance schemes

The Cup Trust
Jenner, and his business partner Anthony Mehigan, set up the Cup Trust charity in 2009. The Cup Trust, which was registered through Mountstar (PTC) Ltd in the Caribbean, received £177 million in donations in a year.
Donors to the Cup Trust benefited from tax deductions of up to £55 million. The Cup Trust has requested £46 million in Gift Aid from HM Revenue, arising from the donations which the trust has received. Gift Aid is a facility offered by HMRC for charities to reclaim basic rate tax on donations.

Accounts show that only £135,000 of the £177 million donated to the Cup Trust has been given to good causes. Almost all of the Cup Trust's income was spent buying UK Government bonds.

References

External links

Guardian Newspaper 23 June 2012 article on the ROMANGATE tax avoidance scheme
The Times 31 January 2013
HOUSE OF COMMONS transcript 6 December 2012

1970 births
Living people
People from Basildon